David Wiltse is an American novelist and playwright known for his versatility of form. He is the author of 12 novels, 14 plays and numerous screenplays and teleplays, including the CBS series "Ladies Man".

Mr. Wiltse was Playwright in Residence at the Westport Country Playhouse from 2007 to 2009. His comedy, "Doubles", ran on Broadway from 1985 to 1986. His recent works for the stage include The Good German, A Marriage Minuet", "Sedition, and Hatchetman.

As a novelist he created the character John Becker who was featured in a six book series consisting of the titles  Prayer For The Dead, Close To The Bone, The Edge Of Sleep, Into The Fire, Bone Deep,  and Blown Away.

Accolades 
Drama Desk Award for "Most Promising Playwright" for Suggs
Position of playwright-in-residence at the Westport Country Playhouse
Edgar Allan Poe Award for Revenge of the Stepford Wives
Best 100 Books of the Year, The New York Times for The Wedding Guest
Best 100 Books of the Year, Time Out, London for The Edge of Sleep
Literary Guild, Main Selection, The Edge of Sleep
Book of the Month Club Selection, The Serpent
Multiple grants from the Connecticut Commission on the Arts

Publication/plays

Crazy Horse And Three Stars
A Marriage Minuet
Scramble! (formerly Hatchetman)
Sedition
Doubles (published by Samuel French, Inc.)
Suggs

all by Broadway Play Publishing Inc.

External links
Official website

Year of birth missing (living people)
Living people
People from Westport, Connecticut
20th-century American novelists
20th-century American dramatists and playwrights
American male novelists
American male dramatists and playwrights
20th-century American male writers